Open-Xchange is a web-based communication, collaboration and office productivity software suite, which enables full integration of email, documents, scheduling and social media.

History
Founded in 2005 by Rafael Laguna and Frank Hoberg, the software started as a Linux-based email and groupware solution that was positioned as open-source alternative to Microsoft Exchange.

Andreas Gauger took over as CEO of Open-Xchange in May 2020.

Overview

The software includes a set of applications for email, contacts, calendars, media and documents. It integrates message streams from Google Mail, Hotmail, Facebook, Twitter and LinkedIn, and can be used as an alternative with integrated functionality similar to Microsoft Exchange Server and Office 365. 

In February 2014, file syncing and collaboration features have been added to the OX App Suite family.

In September 2014, the company introduced a tool called OX Guard to their existing open source email server. Individuals and businesses can use the software to operate their own email services. In July 2015 PGP support has been announced for OX Guard.

Licensing

Community Edition: Backend - GNU Affero General Public License (AGPL) v.3.0; Frontend - GNU AGPL v.3.0.

References

Document management systems
Linux companies
Email clients
Groupware